Philip Weller (born 1956) is a Canadian environmental scientist.

Biography
Philip Weller studied environmental science at the University of Waterloo in Canada and received a Master of Urban and Regional Planning degree from the same university with a focus on rehabilitation and clean-up of environmental hot spots within the Great Lakes of North America.

Later he served for four years as director of Great Lakes United dealing with environmental measures in the Great Lakes area and as a program director of WWF International (Danube Carpathian Programme) in Austria. As a consultant, he managed projects in both Canada and Austria and completed assignments for governments and international organisations. Between 2003 and 2013, he was executive secretary of the International Commission for the Protection of the Danube River. Since 2013, he is project manager for the International Association of Water Supply Companies in the Danube River Catchment Area (IAWD).

In February 2000, EU Commissioner for the Environment Margot Wallström appointed him as a member of the Baia Mare Task Force. In 2003, he became executive secretary of the ICPDR at its headquarters in Vienna. Philip Weller is author of three books on environmental topics, including ‘Freshwater Seas’, an environmental history of the Great Lakes of North America. He is married to an Austrian and is father of two sons.

See also
International Commission for the Protection of the Danube River

References

External links
Official website of the International Commission for the Protection of the Danube River

1956 births
Living people
Canadian environmentalists
Environmental scientists
University of Waterloo alumni
Environmental writers